Jeffrey "Jeff" O. Henley (born 1945) is an American businessman and the vice chairman of Oracle Corporation, having previously served as chairman.

Early life
Henley graduated with a bachelor's degree in economics from the University of California, Santa Barbara (UCSB) in 1966. He received an MBA in finance from the UCLA Anderson School of Management in 1967.

He and his wife Judy Henley established the Jeff Henley Endowed Chair in Economics at UCSB.

Henley is a member of the Cal Gamma chapter of Sigma Phi Epsilon.

Career
Prior to joining Oracle in 1991, Henley served as executive vice president and chief financial officer at Pacific Holding Company, and as executive vice president and chief financial officer at Saga Corporation. He also served as director of finance at Memorex Corporation, and as controller of international operations at Fairchild Semiconductor.

He served as chairman of Oracle from January 2004 to September 2014, prior to which he was the chief financial officer and an executive vice president for 13 years from March 1991 to July 2004. He is also a member of the company's board of directors. Henley was appointed vice chairman in September 2014.

References

External links
 oracle.com

American chairpersons of corporations
American computer businesspeople
Living people
Oracle employees
University of California, Santa Barbara alumni
UCLA Anderson School of Management alumni
American chief financial officers
1945 births